KPBX-FM is a public radio station serving Spokane, Washington. It broadcasts at 91.1 MHz with an ERP of 56,000 watts and is one of three stations operated by Spokane Public Radio. KSFC and KPBZ are the others.

Through seven full-power repeaters and six translators, it reaches 70,000 listeners in eastern Washington, northeastern Oregon, northern Idaho, western Montana and southern British Columbia.

History
The station traces its history to a ten-watt transmitter erected in the early 1970s in the home of George Cole in the South Hill neighborhood of Spokane.  It broadcast various kinds of music eight hours a day from 5 p.m. to 1 a.m..  In 1974, David Schoengold, a record store owner and law school student, took over the station from Cole and expanded its broadcast schedule to 24 hours a day.  It became very popular, with people waiting at all hours of the day to go on the air.  It also gained the attention of National Public Radio, which sent tapes of All Things Considered.  The nearest NPR station in the area was KWSU in Pullman, which was all but unlistenable in most of the city despite being only an hour south.

Schoengold wanted a better station for the area, so he formed the Spokane Public Broadcasting Association to raise funding for a full-power public radio station.  The 10-watt transmitter went off the air at the suggestion of one of Schoengold's friends in order to make it easier to raise the money. Getting the required funding took longer than expected, in part because the board was committed to keeping the proposed station as a community license. While linking up with a local nonprofit or an educational institution would have provided greater security, many board members believed that it would have also compromised the station's ability to program potentially controversial content.

After several years of fundraising (with a final goal larger than that of a typical year's fundraising at area public television station KSPS-TV) and several delays in the on-air date, KPBX finally went on the air on January 20, 1980. The station was actually ready to sign on in 1979, having hired a general manager/program director and 13 staffers. However, FCC concerns forced a year's delay. The station had to postpone its first pledge drive because it was scheduled for May 18, the date Mount St. Helens erupted, and Pacific Northwest Bell requested that phone lines be used for emergencies only.

The station broadcasts a mix of NPR news and entertainment, classical music and jazz. KPBX also airs BirdNote, a two-minute show about birds and nature, produced in Washington State.

It is one of seven local Spokane FM radio stations heard across Canada to subscribers of the Shaw Direct satellite TV service.

KPBX also broadcast the Washington Talking Book & Braille Library's Evergreen Radio Reading Service to blind and handicapped listeners on its 67kHz subcarrier, until the service's closure on 2014 August 15. KPBX was one of three major FM stations in Washington to do so; KUOW-FM in Seattle and KFAE-FM in Richland were the others. This service could be freely and legally listened to by the public. However, this required a special FM radio capable of receiving such broadcasts; it could not be received on a standard FM radio.

The station's studio is located at 1229 N. Monroe Street; the station renovated a former fire station to relocate their offices in 2015.

Repeaters

Translators

References

External links 
 
  How Do I Receive the Evergreen Radio Reading Service?

Other station data

PBX-FM
PBX-FM
NPR member stations
Radio stations established in 1971